Meryam Joobeur is a Tunisian Canadian film director. She is most noted for her 2018 short film Brotherhood (Ikhwène), which won the Toronto International Film Festival Award for Best Canadian Short Film at the 2018 Toronto International Film Festival and was nominated for the Academy Award for Best Live Action Short Film at the 92nd Academy Awards.

Raised in Tunisia and the United States, she is currently based in Montreal, Quebec, where she is a graduate of the Cinema-Communications program at Dawson College and the Mel Hoppenheim School of Cinema at Concordia University. Prior to Brotherhood, she wrote and directed the short films Gods, Weeds and Revolutions (2012) and Born in the Maelstrom (2017).

In 2020, Joobeur was one of the recipients of the 2020 Top 25 Canadian Immigrant Awards.

Her debut feature film Motherhood is in development. Joobeur participated in the Sundance Screenwriters' Lab at the 2021 Sundance Film Festival, where she was awarded the $10,000 Sundance Institute/NHK Award toward the film's production. Despite its similar title, Motherhood is not an expansion of or sequel to Brotherhood.

References

External links

21st-century Canadian screenwriters
21st-century Canadian women writers
Canadian women film directors
Canadian women screenwriters
Film directors from Montreal
Writers from Montreal
Concordia University alumni
Tunisian emigrants to Canada
Living people
Year of birth missing (living people)